Good Ship Lollipop may refer to:

 "On the Good Ship Lollipop", a song made popular by Shirley Temple
 The Good Ship Lollipop, a riverboat in the Gateway Clipper Fleet in Pittsburgh, Pennsylvania